Yedisu is a town (belde) and seat of the Yedisu District of Bingöl Province in Turkey. The town is populated by Kurds of the Çarekan tribe and had a population of 1,468 in 2021.

The town is divided into the neighborhoods of Düşengi, Kabaoluk, Koşan, Merkez and Yeni Mahalle are attached to the village.

The mayor is Ömer İsen (MHP).

References

Populated places in Bingöl Province
Kurdish settlements in Bingöl Province
Yedisu District
Towns in Turkey